The second season of the animated series Winx Club aired from 19 April to 14 July 2005, consisting of 26 episodes. The series was created by Iginio Straffi, who also acted as executive producer and director of the season.

The season follows the Winx Club's second year at the Alfea College for Fairies, where they strive to earn an enhancement to their powers called Charmix. A new member of the Winx Club (Aisha, the Fairy of Waves) is introduced in the season's first episode. Meanwhile, the Trix are freed from their prison by Darkar, who becomes their leader.

In February 2011, Viacom (owner of Nickelodeon) became a co-owner of the Rainbow studio. Rainbow and Nickelodeon Animation Studio produced a Winx Club revival series, which began with four television specials that retell the first two seasons of the original show. The fourth special, "The Shadow Phoenix," retold the plot of the second season and premiered on October 16, 2011.

Production
On 21 April 2004, Winx Club production company Rainbow S.r.l. announced that a second season of the series was in progress. The season's debut on 19 April 2005 coincided with new merchandise lines. A spin-off series based on the chibi-inspired Pixie characters from the second season was launched in 2010, following a licensing program in 2006.

Episodes

Home media

Notes

References

Winx Club